Agathodes thomensis is a moth in the family Crambidae. It was described by Armando Jacques Favre Castel-Branco in 1973. It is found on São Tomé Island off the west coast of Africa.

References

Moths described in 1973
Spilomelinae
Moths of São Tomé and Príncipe